Donald Johnson and Cyril Suk were the defending champions, but competed this year with different partners. Johnson teamed up with Lucas Arnold Ker and lost in the first round to Nicolas Kiefer and Max Mirnyi, while Suk teamed up with Aleksandar Kitinov and also lost in first round to Roger Federer and Marc Rosset.

Jiří Novák and David Rikl won the title by defeating Jérôme Golmard and Michael Kohlmann 3–6, 6–3, 6–4 in the final.

Seeds

Draw

Draw

References
 Official results archive (ATP)
 Official results archive (ITF)

Swiss Open (tennis)
2000 ATP Tour
Swiss Open